Jacques "Crabouif" Higelin is the third album by French rock singer Jacques Higelin, released in 1971 on the Saravah label, for whom it would be his last release. "Crabouif" was Higelin's nickname at the time. The music on this album is mostly minimalistic, improvised, and experimental.

Track listing

Personnel

Musicians 
 Jacques Higelin - piano, banjo, various instruments, vocals.
 Jean Querlier - flute.
 Joël Favreau - guitar.
 Arthur H - child voice.
 Areski Belkacem, Jim Cuomo, Elliott Delman, Annie the Hat, Jack Treese, Jean-Louis Lefevre, Jean-Pierre Arnoux, Deddy, "Naga", Elie and Kuëlan

Production 
 Jacques Higelin - producer, cover art.
 Daniel Vallencien, Jéhol Van Bay - recording.
 Patrick Ghnassia - photographs.

References 

1971 albums
Jacques Higelin albums